Abdellatif Filali (26 January 1928 – 20 March 2009) was a Moroccan politician and diplomat who served as Prime Minister of Morocco from 25 May 1994 to 4 February 1998. He was the 11th prime minister of Morocco and served under king Hassan II. Filali was known to have progressive views.

Early life
Filali was born in February 26, 1929 in Beni Mellal, Morocco. The son of a cadi, Abdellatif Filali had studied law in France before opting for a diplomatic career.

Career
He began his diplomatic career at the United Nations as Chargé d'affaires of Morocco between 1958 and 1959 in New York, then in France from 1961 to 1962. On June 17, 1968 He became Minister of Higher Education in the Mohamed Benhima government.

On August 4, 1971, he was appointed Minister of Foreign Affairs in the Mohammed Karim Lamrani government, on April 12, 1972 he was reappointed to the same position.

In 1973, he was appointed Ambassador of the Kingdom of Morocco in Madrid, he notably negotiated the withdrawal of Spanish military troops from Western Sahara. 

Filali served as the Morocco's ambassador to several significant countries, including Spain, Algeria, the United Kingdom and China. Then he served as Prime Minister of Morocco from 25 May 1994 to 4 February 1998. He also served as foreign minister of Morocco from 1985 to 1999. In addition, he held the minister of state portfolio during his term as prime minister. He initiated TV broadcasts in the Moroccan Berber dialects. Filali was replaced by Abderrahmane Youssoufi as prime minister in 1998.

Personal life
Filali was married to a French woman, Anne Belghmi Zwobada, putative daughter of Jacques Zwobada, with whom he had a daughter, Yasmina, and a son, Fuad Filali; the ex-CEO of Morocco's largest private company ONA Group and the former husband of Lalla Meryem, who is the daughter of late Hassan II and elder sister of Mohammed VI. After retiring politics, Filali permanently settled in his wife's house in France and wrote a reference book about foreign relations of Morocco at the second half of past century.

Death
Filali died on 20 March 2009 in the Paris suburb of Clamart due to a heart failure. He was 81.

Honours 
 Knight Grand Cross of the Royal Order of Isabella the Catholic (Spain, 10/09/1971).
 Honorary Knight Grand Cross of the Order of St Michael and St George [GCMG] (United Kingdom).
 Honorary Knight Grand Cross of the Royal Victorian Order [GCVO] (United Kingdom).

References

1928 births
People from Beni Mellal
People from Fez, Morocco
Moroccan diplomats
Prime Ministers of Morocco
Ambassadors of Morocco to Algeria
Government ministers of Morocco
Ambassadors of Morocco to the United Kingdom
Ambassadors of Morocco to China
Ambassadors of Morocco to Spain
Foreign ministers of Morocco
Honorary Knights Grand Cross of the Order of St Michael and St George
Honorary Knights Grand Cross of the Royal Victorian Order
Knights Grand Cross of the Order of Isabella the Catholic
Member of the Academy of the Kingdom of Morocco
2009 deaths